Broom is a surname. Notable people with the surname include:

Christina Broom (1862–1939), British photographer
Jacob Broom (1752–1810), American businessman and politician
Jacob Broom (congressman) (1808–1864), United States Representative from Pennsylvania
James M. Broom (1776–1850), American lawyer and politician
Leonard Broom (1911–2009), American sociologist
Mark Broom (born 1971), British techno musician and DJ
Neil Broom (born 1983), New Zealand cricketer
Robert Broom (1866–1951), British-South African physician and paleontologist
Romell Broom (1956–2020), American murderer
Ron Broom (1925–2016), New Zealand cricketer
William Broom (1895–1971), English footballer

See also 

 Broom
 Broomfield (surname)
 Broomhall (surname)

English-language surnames
Surnames of British Isles origin